St. Mary's Beneficial Society Hall, constructed in 1892, is a historic building located in Upper Marlboro, Prince George's County, Maryland.  

The Hall, an excellent example of an African American multi-purpose building, served as a meeting place, social and political center, and house of worship for African Americans living in a segregated society. It is located nearly across the street from St. Mary's Catholic Church, with which it is historically associated. 

It is a one-story wood frame gable-front building, In 1988, a law firm acquired the building and converted it to office space.

It was listed on the National Register of Historic Places in 2005.

References

External links

, including photo in 2004, at Maryland Historical Trust website
St. Mary's Beneficial Society Hall, 14825 Pratt Street, at Main Street, Upper Marlboro, Prince George's, MD at the Historic American Buildings Survey (HABS)

Properties of religious function on the National Register of Historic Places in Maryland
African-American history of Prince George's County, Maryland
Roman Catholic churches completed in 1892
19th-century Roman Catholic church buildings in the United States
Historic American Buildings Survey in Maryland
National Register of Historic Places in Prince George's County, Maryland

African-American Roman Catholic churches